Christiaan Jan Petrus Meyer (born ) is a South African rugby union player for  in the Currie Cup and Rugby Challenge. His regular position is scrum-half.

He was included in the  squad for the 2018 Super Rugby season.

References

South African rugby union players
Living people
1994 births
People from Springs, Gauteng
Rugby union scrum-halves
Golden Lions players
Griquas (rugby union) players
Rugby union players from Gauteng
Lions (United Rugby Championship) players